The Niagara Junction Railway (reporting marks NJ, NIAJ) was a switching railroad serving Niagara Falls, New York.

History 
The company was created in 1898 as a subsidiary of the Niagara Falls Hydraulic Power and Manufacturing Company. In 1913 the line was electrified. In 1948 the Niagara Falls Power Company sold the railroad to its connecting companies: the New York Central, the Erie, and the Lehigh Valley. After a series of mergers in the 1960s, the Niagara Junction was finally dissolved as an independent company in 1976 when the Consolidated Rail Corporation was formed to take over operations of bankrupt railroads in the Northeast. The line was dieselized in 1979. After over a year of storage, three electric locomotives were overhauled in December 1980 and transferred to Grand Central Terminal in New York City.

Incidents 
Just after 9:30 am on Wednesday 22 January 1958, a tank car exploded while being switched at the Niagara Junction's yard on Porter Road. The cause was never determined.

Locomotives

References 

New York (state) railroads
Switching and terminal railroads
Conrail